Wheelchair tennis was first contested at the Summer Paralympics as a demonstration sport in 1988, with two events being held (men's and women's singles). It became an official medal-awarding sport in 1992 and has been competed at every Summer Paralympics since then. Four events were held from 1992 to 2000, with quad events (mixed gender) in both singles and doubles added in 2004.

Summary

Events 
Six events are contested at each Paralympic. Only men's and women's singles were held at the 1988 Paralympics, when it was a demonstration sport. These were joined by men's and women's doubles events four years later when the sport turned an official event.In 2004, two new events were added with quadriplegia (as such they are also known as "quad" events) and unlike the other events they are mixed. But until the 2016 Games, only two women competed in the event, the Dutch Monique de Beer and the Canadian Sarah Hunter, both competed in 2004 and 2008. However, the Dutch is still the only woman to this day to win a medal at the event, a bronze in the doubles event in 2004.

Current events
Men's singles
Men's doubles
Women's singles
Women's doubles
Quad singles
Quad doubles

Historical medal table

Medalists 
Medal winning teams for every Summer Games since 1992 are as follows:

Men's singles

Women's singles

Quad singles

Men's doubles

Women's doubles

Quad doubles

Nations

See also 
Tennis at the Summer Olympics

References 

 
Wheelchair tennis
Paralympics